Əlikənd (also, Alikend and Alykend) is a village and municipality in the Ujar Rayon of Azerbaijan.  It has a population of 821.

References 

World Gazetteer: Azerbaijan – World-Gazetteer.com

Populated places in Ujar District